The 1996 Cal Poly Mustangs football team represented California Polytechnic State University during the 1996 NCAA Division I-AA football season.

Cal Poly competed as an NCAA Division I-AA independent starting in 1996. They had previously been a member of the American West Conference (AWC). The 1996 Mustangs were led by third-year head coach Andre Patterson and played home games at Mustang Stadium in San Luis Obispo, California. They finished the season with a record of five wins and six losses (5–6). Overall, the team was outscored by its opponents 308–356 for the season. This was coach Patterson's last year with the Mustangs. In his three years as head coach, the team compiled a record of 17–16, or a .515 winning percentage.

Schedule

Notes

References

Cal Poly
Cal Poly Mustangs football seasons
Cal Poly Mustangs football